Oof or OOF may refer to:

Acronyms
 Out of focus; see List of abbreviations in photography
 Other Official Flows, a categorization of foreign aid used by official development assistance
 Out of facility; see List of business and finance abbreviations

Music
 Oof (album), a 1989 album by the Happy Flowers
 Oof! (EP), a 2009 EP by Blue Scholars
 "Oof", a 2002 song by Özlem Tekin
 Oof! Records, a label of North Sea Radio Orchestra
 Oof Oof, a 2005 album by Nelly Makdessy

Other uses
 Oof (magazine and gallery), a magazine and gallery for football-related art
 Roblox death sound, a sound effect in the video game platform Roblox, commonly referred to as "oof", which now has been replaced with another Roblox death sound
 OOF: Finite Element Analysis of Microstructures, a software package developed by R. Edwin Garcia